See the Light is the debut album by the Jeff Healey Band, released in 1988. It was No. 50 on the top 100 albums in Canada in 1989, and was the sixth best-selling Cancon album in Canada of 1989. In 1990 it was nominated for the Juno Award for "Album of the Year".

Track listing

Production
 Producers – Greg Ladanyi (Tracks 1-8, 10, 11 & 12); Thom Panunzio (Tracks 1-12); Jimmy Iovine (Track 9).
 Production Assistant – Debbie Sommer
 Engineer – Thom Panunzio
 Mixing – Greg Ladanyi (Tracks 1-8, 10, 11 & 12); Thom Panunzio (Track 9).
 Assistant Engineers – Paul Dieter, Sharon Rice and Duane Seykora.
 Mastered by Ron Lewter and Doug Sax at The Mastering Lab (Hollywood, California).
 Art Direction and Design – Maude Gilman
 Photography – Darius Anthony 
 Sleeve Notes – Jas Obrecht

Personnel
The Jeff Healey Band
 Jeff Healey – lead vocals, electric guitars, harmonica (4)
 Joe Rockman – bass guitar, backing vocals (7)
 Tom Stephen – drums, percussion

Additional Musicians
 Benmont Tench – keyboards (1, 2, 8, 10)
 Robbie Blunt – electric guitars (6, 11)
 Bobbye Hall – percussion (7)
 Marilyn Martin – backing vocals (3, 5, 8)
 Timothy B. Schmit – backing vocals (3, 5, 8)
 Kipp Lennon – backing vocals (7)
 Mark Lennon – backing vocals (7)
 Michael Lennon – backing vocals (7)
 Pat Lennon – backing vocals (7)

Chart positions

Certifications

References 

1988 debut albums
The Jeff Healey Band albums
Albums produced by Jimmy Iovine
Albums produced by Greg Ladanyi
Albums produced by Thom Panunzio
Arista Records albums